Our Lady of Sorrows, Our Lady of Dolours, the Sorrowful Mother or Mother of Sorrows, and Our Lady of Piety, Our Lady of the Seven Sorrows or Our Lady of the Seven Dolours are names by which Mary, mother of Jesus, is referred to in relation to sorrows in life. As , it is also a key subject for Marian art in the Catholic Church.

The Seven Sorrows of Mary are a popular religious theme and a Catholic devotion. In Christian imagery, the Virgin Mary is portrayed sorrowful and in tears, with one or seven swords piercing her heart, iconography based on the prophecy of Simeon in Luke 2:34–35. Pious practices in reference to this title include the Chaplet of the Seven Sorrows, the Seven Principal Dolors of the Blessed Virgin, the Novena in Honor of the Seven Sorrows of Mary, and the Via Matris.

The feast of Our Lady of Sorrows is liturgically celebrated every 15 September, while a feast, the Friday of Sorrows is observed in some Catholic countries.

Seven Sorrows of Mary 
The Seven Sorrows (or Dolors) are events in the life of Mary that are a popular devotion and are frequently depicted in art.

These Seven Sorrows should not be confused with the five Sorrowful Mysteries of the Rosary. 

Traditionally, the Seven Sorrows are:
 The Prophecy of Simeon in Luke 2; 
 The Flight into Egypt in Matthew 2;
 The Loss of the Child Jesus in the Temple of Jerusalem, also in Luke 2;
 Mary's meeting Jesus on the Via Dolorosa, the Fourth station of the Cross which is not found in Bible;  
 The Crucifixion of Jesus on Mount Calvary in Matthew 27, Mark 15, Luke 23, and especially John 19;
 Jesus is Taken Down from the Cross in Matthew 27, Mark 15, Luke 23, and John 19;
 The Burial of Jesus by Joseph of Arimathea also in Matthew 27, Mark 15, Luke 23, and John 19;

Devotions to the Seven Sorrows

Western Christianity

Earlier, in 1232, seven youths in Tuscany founded the Servite Order (also known as the "Servite Friars", or the "Order of the Servants of Mary"). Five years later, they took up the sorrows of Mary, standing under the Cross, as the principal devotion of their order.

Over the centuries several devotions, and even orders, arose around meditation on Mary's Sorrows in particular. The Servites developed the three most common devotions to Our Lady's Sorrows, namely the Rosary of the Seven Sorrows, the Black Scapular of the Seven Dolours of Mary and the Novena to Our Sorrowful Mother. The rosary consists of a chaplet of seven septets of beads (upon which is said an Ave), separated by one bead (on which is prayed a Pater Noster. Meditations for each dolor were composed by Pope Pius VII in 1818. 

The Black Scapular is a symbol of the Confraternity of Our Lady of Sorrows, which is associated with the Servite Order. Most devotional scapulars have requirements regarding ornamentation or design. The devotion of the Black Scapular requires only that it be made of black woollen cloth. From the National Shrine of Saint Peregrine spread the Sorrowful Mother Novena, the core of which is the Via Matris. The core of the prayers in the novena is the Via Matris.

Eastern Christianity
On February 2, the same day as the Great Feast of the Meeting of the Lord, Orthodox Christians and Eastern Catholics commemorate a wonder-working icon of the Theotokos (Mother of God) known as "the Softening of Evil Hearts" or "Simeon's Prophecy".

It depicts Mary at the moment that Simeon the Righteous says, "Yea, a sword shall pierce through thy own soul also....". She stands with her hands upraised in prayer, and seven swords pierce her heart, indicative of the seven sorrows. This is one of the few Orthodox icons of the Theotokos which do not depict the infant Jesus. The refrain "Rejoice, much-sorrowing Mother of God, turn our sorrows into joy and soften the hearts of evil men!" is also used.

Liturgical feast

Our Lady of Compassion

The Feast of Our Lady of Sorrows grew in popularity in the 12th century, although under various titles. Some writings would place its roots in the eleventh century, especially among the Benedictine monks.

The feast of the Our Lady of Sorrows was originated by a provincial synod of Cologne in 1423. It was designated for the Friday after the third Sunday after Easter and had the title: Commemoratio angustiae et doloris B. Mariae V. Its object was the sorrow of Mary during the Crucifixion and Death of Christ. Before the sixteenth century this feast was limited to the dioceses of North Germany, Scandinavia, and Scotland.

According to Fr. William Saunders, "in 1482, the feast was officially placed in the Roman Missal under the title of Our Lady of Compassion, highlighting the great love our Blessed Mother displayed in suffering with her Son. The word compassion derives from the Latin roots cum and patior which means "to suffer with".

After 1600 it became popular in France and was set for the Friday before Palm Sunday. By a Decree of 22 April 1727, Pope Benedict XIII extended it to the entire Latin Church, under the title "Septem dolorum B.M.V.". In 1954, it still held the rank of major double (slightly lower than the rank of the September feast) in the General Roman Calendar. Pope John XXIII's 1960 Code of Rubrics reduced it to the level of a commemoration.

The Seven Sorrows of the Blessed Virgin Mary
In 1668, a separate feast of the Seven Sorrows of Mary, celebrated on the third Sunday in September, was granted to the Servites. Pope Innocent XII renamed it the Feast of Our Lady of Sorrows. Pope Pius VII introduced it into the General Roman Calendar in 1814. In 1913, Pope Pius X, in view of his reform giving precedence to Sundays over ordinary feasts, moved this feast to September 15, the day after the Feast of the Cross. It is still observed on that date.

Since there were thus two feasts with the same title, on each of which the Stabat Mater sequence was recited, the Passion Week celebration was removed from the General Roman Calendar in 1969 as a duplicate of the September feast. Each of the two celebrations had been called a feast of "The Seven Sorrows of the Blessed Virgin Mary" (Latin: Septem Dolorum Beatae Mariae Virginis). Recitation of the Stabat Mater was made optional.

On the second Sunday of September, the congregation of Maria SS. Addolorata in the Carroll Gardens neighborhood of Brooklyn, hold an annual procession with a statue of Our Lady of Sorrows. The tradition started in the 1940s with Italian immigrants from Mola di Bari celebrating the Feast of their hometown patroness, Our Lady of Sorrows.

Iconography
Our Lady of Sorrows is  often depicted with either one or seven swords piercing her heart, the first a reference to the prophecy of Simeon, the second to the Seven Sorrows. The type dates from the latter part of the 15th century.

Patronage 

Our Lady of Sorrows is the patron saint of:
 people named Dolores, Dolorita, Lola and Pia. 
 Poland: the icon Our Lady of Sorrows, Queen and Patroness of Poland was canonically crowned by Pope Paul VI on 15 August 1967.
 Slovakia: 15 September is also a national public holiday
 Granada, Spain: September 15 is a public holiday in the city.
 The Congregation of Holy Cross
 Order of the Servants of Mary
 Sisters of Our Lady of Sorrows
 Mola di Bari and the Molise region of Italy
 Nuestra Señora de la Soledad de Porta Vaga, Queen and Patroness of the City and Province of Cavite, Philippines
Ronda, Cebu
 Mississippi, United States
 Lanzarote, Canary Islands

Churches:
 Mater Dolorosa (Berlin-Lankwitz)
 Our Lady of Sorrows Basilica, Chicago, United States
 Our Lady of Sorrows Basilica, Šaštín-Stráže, Slovakia 
 , Montreal, Canada
Senhora das Dores Church, Póvoa de Varzim, Portugal
Nuestra Señora de los Dolores, Montevideo
St. Mary of Sorrows (Fairfax, Virginia)
Our Lady of Sorrows Church (Santa Barbara, California)
 Our Lady of Sorrows Church in Ká-Hó, Coloane, Macau.
Our Lady of Sorrows of Calolbon (Batong Paloway), Paloway, San Andres, Catanduanes, Philippines
 National Shrine of Our Lady of Sorrows, Dolores, Quezon, Philippines
Diocesan Shrine of Nuestra Señora de los Dolores de Turumba, Pakil, Laguna, Philippines
 Church of Our Lady of Seven Sorrows, Rabštejn nad Střelou, Czech Republic
Our Lady of Compassion, Piedade, Goa, India
 Shrine of Our Lady of Sorrows, Starkenburg, Missouri
 Church of Blessed Virgin Mary of Sorrows, Špansko, Zagreb
 Church of Our Lady of Sorrows, Mrkopalj, Croatia
 , Molise, Italy

Gallery
Our Lady of Sorrows, depicted as "Mater Dolorosa" (Mother of Sorrows) has been the subject of some key works of Catholic Marian art. Mater Dolorosa is one of the three common artistic representations of a sorrowful Virgin Mary, the other two being Stabat Mater and Pietà.

In this iconography, Our Lady of Seven Sorrows is at times simply represented in a sad and anguished mode by herself, her expression being that of tears and sadness. In other representations the Virgin Mary is depicted with seven swords in her heart, a reference to the prophecy of Simeon at the Presentation of Jesus at the Temple.

See also 
 Friday of Sorrows
 Mission San Francisco de Asís in San Francisco, California, known also as Mission Dolores
 Pietà
 Seven Joys of Mary
 Stabat Mater

References

Further reading 
The Seven Sorrows of Mary, by Joel Giallanza, C.S.C. 2008, published by Ave Maria Press,

External links 

 The Seven Sorrows Devotion

 
Catholic holy days
Virgin Mary in art
Servite Order
Titles of Mary
September observances